Alexander Aleksandrovich Vesnin (28 May 1883, Yuryevets – 7 September 1959, Moscow), together with his brothers Leonid and Viktor, was a leading light of Constructivist architecture. He is best known for his meticulous perspectival drawings such as Leningrad Pravda of 1924.

In addition to being an architect, he was a theatre designer and painter, frequently working with Lyubov Popova on designs for workers' festivals, and for the theatre of Tairov. He was one of the exhibitors in the pioneering Constructivist exhibition 5×5=25 in 1921. He was the head, along with Moisei Ginzburg, of the Constructivist OSA Group. Among the completed buildings designed by the Vesnin brothers in the later 1920s were department stores, a club for former Tsarist political prisoners as well as the Likachev Works Palace of Culture in Moscow. Vesnin was a vocal supporter of the works of Le Corbusier, and acclaimed his Tsentrosoyuz building as 'the best building constructed in Moscow for a century'. After the return to Classicism in the Soviet Union, Vesnin had no further major projects.

Selected work
1934 People's Commissariat of Heavy Industry Project
1930 Oilworkers' Club, Baku
1930-36 Likachev Palace of Culture, Moscow
1928 House of Film Actors, Moscow
1926 Mostorg department store, Moscow
1924 Leningradskaya Pravda project
1922-23 Palace of Labor project

References

S.N Khan-Magomedov, Alexander Vesnin and Russian Constructivism (Thames and Hudson, 1988)
Khan-Magomedov S. O. Architecture of the Soviet avant-garde: In 2 books: B. 1: Formation problems. Masters and currents. - M .: Stroyizdat. 1996 .-- 709 pp., Ill. .
A.G. Chinyakov. The Vesnin brothers. Moscow, 1970.

External links

 Alexander Vesnin, photographs, Canadian Centre for Architecture (digitized items)

1883 births
1959 deaths
Academicians of the USSR Academy of Architecture
Recipients of the Order of the Red Banner of Labour
Architects from the Russian Empire
Constructivist architects
Modernist architects
Modernist architecture in Russia
Russian architects
Russian avant-garde
Soviet architects
Burials at Novodevichy Cemetery
Saint-Petersburg State University of Architecture and Civil Engineering alumni